, also known as NCC, is a television network headquartered in Nagasaki Prefecture, Japan.  It is affiliated with All-Nippon News Network (ANN).  TV Asahi Holdings and Asahi Shimbun are the main shareholders of NCC.  

Nagasaki Culture Telecasting is the third commercial television station in Nagasaki prefecture.  It was started broadcasting in 1990,  and started digital terrestrial television broadcasting on December 2006.  In 2020, NCC started to use its new master control room.

References

External links
 Official website 

All-Nippon News Network
Television stations in Japan
Television channels and stations established in 1988
1988 establishments in Japan